Gemechu is a male given name of Ethiopian origin that may refer to:

Gemechu Woyecha (born 1979), Ethiopian marathon runner formerly of Qatar
Gemechu Kebede (born 1973), Ethiopian marathon runner who finished twelfth at the 1999 World Championships
Shitaye Gemechu (born 1980), Ethiopian female marathon runner
Lishan Dula Gemechu (born 1987), Ethiopian female marathon runner competing for Bahrain

Ethiopian given names
Amharic-language names